The Milwaukee Mustangs were a professional arena football team based in Milwaukee, Wisconsin. They were members of the Arena Football League (AFL), which they joined in 2010 during the league's restructuring. They played their home games at the Bradley Center in downtown Milwaukee.

The team began play in 2009 as the Milwaukee Iron, and competed in af2, the AFL's developmental league. They joined the AFL after the league's restructuring in 2010. On January 27, 2011, the team officially changed its name to the Mustangs, after an older team that had played in the AFL from 1994 to 2001. Their final head coach was Bob Landsee. The Mustangs were dormant for the 2013 season. In October 2013, the rights to the franchise were sold to Terry Emmert, who subsequently started the Portland Thunder in Portland, Oregon.

History

Milwaukee Iron
 The Milwaukee Iron were announced as an af2 expansion team in March 2008 when the team's ownership group announced a three-year lease agreement to play at the Bradley Center beginning with the 2009 season. The announcement came the day before the Milwaukee Bonecrushers kicked off play in the Continental Indoor Football League at Milwaukee's US Cellular Arena.

Milwaukee had been without an arena football team since the Milwaukee Mustangs of the Arena Football League folded in 2001 after not being allowed to play at the Bradley Center.

The Iron played its first game on Thursday, March 12, 2009, a 60–0 exhibition shutout of the New Zealand Overstayers at the Bradley Center. They opened the regular season on Friday, March 27, 2009 when they played host to the Iowa Barnstormers. The Iron lost 60–38.

The Iron entered the Arena Football League in 2010. The team finished the year 11–5 and won the Midwest Division.

Milwaukee Mustangs
The team changed its name to the Mustangs on January 27, 2011. The name "Mustangs" was chosen as it was the name of the original franchise that existed from 1994 to 2001.  The team's dancers were called the Fillies. The Mustangs were covered locally by WAUK (540 ESPN MILWAUKEE) and Time Warner Cable Sports 32.

On October 2, 2013 the AFL announced that an ownership group led by Portland businessman Terry W. Emmert has been approved by the AFL’s Board of Directors to purchase a majority of the Milwaukee Mustangs and relocate the team to Portland, Oregon. The team began regular season play as the Portland Thunder in 2014 at the Moda Center (20,636), home of the NBA’s Portland Trail Blazers.

Season-by-season

Players of note

Final roster

Retired uniform numbers

Individual awards

All-Arena players
The following Mustangs players were named to All-Arena Teams:
 QB Chris Greisen (1)
 WR Tiger Jones (1) 
 DL Khreem Smith (1), Luis Vasquez (1)
 LB Marcus Everett (1)
 DB Andre Jones (1)

All-Ironman players
The following Mustangs players were named to All-Ironman Teams: 
 WR/LB Marcus Everett (1)

Coaches of note

Head coaches

Final staff

Notes

External links
 Milwaukee Mustangs

 
2011 establishments in Wisconsin
2012 disestablishments in Wisconsin